Jan Sedlák (born 25 October 1994) is a Czech professional footballer who plays as a defensive midfielder for Polish club Ruch Chorzów.

References
 Profile at FC Zbrojovka Brno official site

1994 births
Living people
Sportspeople from the South Moravian Region
People from Blansko
Association football defenders
Czech footballers
FC Zbrojovka Brno players
SK Líšeň players
MFK Karviná players
SK Sigma Olomouc players
Ruch Chorzów players
Czech First League players
Czech National Football League players

Czech expatriate footballers
Expatriate footballers in Poland
Czech expatriate sportspeople in Poland